Phil Vickery may refer to:

 Phil Vickery (rugby union) (born 1976), English rugby union footballer
 Phil Vickery (chef) (born 1961), celebrity chef